Go in Numbers is an album by American jazz trumpeter Wadada Leo Smith which was recorded live in 1980 and released on the Italian Black Saint label. He leads the New Dalta Akhri, a quartet with Dwight Andrews, Bobby Naughton and Wes Brown.

Reception

The Penguin Guide to Jazz notes about the title track that "'Smith's opening figures seem to contain half-remembered elements of Ives' The Unanswered Question. Elsewhere he sounds uncannily like a slowed-up version of Don Cherry, an influence that was to seem ever more pressing in years to come."

Track listing
All compositions by Wadada Leo Smith
 "The World Soul" - 3:50
 "Go in Numbers" - 16:59
 "Illumination: The Nguzo Saba" - 16:09
 "Changes" - 6:59

Personnel
Wadada Leo Smith - trumpet, flugelhorn, atenteben flute
Dwight Andrews - tenor sax, soprano sax, flute
Bobby Naughton - vibraphone
Wes Brown - bass, odurogyaba flute

References

1982 live albums
Wadada Leo Smith live albums
Black Saint/Soul Note live albums